Changan (also Romanized as Changān) is a village in Qahab-e Jonubi Rural District, in the Central District of Isfahan County, Isfahan Province, Iran. At the 2006 census, its population was 159, in 43 families.

References 

Populated places in Isfahan County